This was the fifth season for the League Cup, known as the Players No.6 Trophy for sponsorship reasons.

Widnes won the trophy by beating Hull F.C. by the score of 19-13 in the final played at Headingley, Leeds, West Yorkshire. The attendance was 9,035 and receipts were £6275.

Background 
This season saw no changes in the  entrants, no new members and no withdrawals, the number remaining at eighteen.

Competition and results

Round 1 - First  round 

Involved  16 matches and 32 clubs

Round 2 - Second round 

Involved  8 matches and 16 clubs

Round 2 - Second round replays 
Involved 1 match and 2 clubs

Round 3 - quarterfinals 
Involved 4 matches with 8 clubs

Round 4 – semifinals 
Involved 2 matches and 4 clubs

Final

Teams and scorers 

Scoring - Try = three points - Goal = two points - Drop goal = one point

Prize money 
As part of the sponsorship deal and funds, the  prize money awarded to the competing teams for this season is as follows :-

The road to success 
This tree excludes any preliminary round fixtures

Notes and comments 
1 * Mayfield are a Junior (amateur) club from Rochdale
2 * Although Mayfield were drawn at home, the match was moved to Salford
3 * Rothmans Rugby League Yearbooks 1990-1991  and 1991-92  and Wigan official archives give the score as 3-57, but RUGBYLEAGUEprojects and The News of the World/Empire News annual 1976–77 give it as 3-53
4 * Pilkington Recs are a Junior (amateur) club from St Helens, home ground was City Road until they moved to Ruskin Drive from 2011-12
5 * Wigan official archives gives the score as 25-8 but RUGBYLEAGUEprojects gives it as 28-8
6 * Wigan official archives gives the score as 23-3 but RUGBYLEAGUEprojects and The News of the World/Empire News annual 1976–77 give it as 23-8
7  * Headingley, Leeds, is the home ground of Leeds RLFC with a capacity of 21,000. The record attendance was  40,175 for a league match between Leeds and Bradford Northern on 21 May 1947.

General information for those unfamiliar 
The council of the Rugby Football League voted to introduce a new competition, to be similar to The Football Association and Scottish Football Association's "League Cup". It was to be a similar knock-out structure to, and to be secondary to, the Challenge Cup. As this was being formulated, sports sponsorship was becoming more prevalent and as a result John Player and Sons, a division of Imperial Tobacco Company, became sponsors, and the competition never became widely known as the "League Cup" 
The competition ran from 1971–72 until 1995-96 and was initially intended for the professional clubs plus the two amateur BARLA National Cup finalists. In later seasons the entries were expanded to take in other amateur and French teams. The competition was dropped due to "fixture congestion" when Rugby League became a summer sport
The Rugby League season always (until the onset of "Summer Rugby" in 1996) ran from around August-time through to around May-time and this competition always took place early in the season, in the Autumn, with the final usually taking place in late January 
The competition was variably known, by its sponsorship name, as the Player's No.6 Trophy (1971–1977), the John Player Trophy (1977–1983), the John Player Special Trophy (1983–1989), and the Regal Trophy in 1989.

See also 
1975–76 Northern Rugby Football League season
1975 Lancashire Cup
1975 Yorkshire Cup
Player's No.6 Trophy
Rugby league county cups

References

External links
Saints Heritage Society
1896–97 Northern Rugby Football Union season at wigan.rlfans.com 
Hull&Proud Fixtures & Results 1896/1897
Widnes Vikings - One team, one passion Season In Review - 1896-97
The Northern Union at warringtonwolves.org
Huddersfield R L Heritage
Wakefield until I die

1975 in English rugby league
1976 in English rugby league
League Cup (rugby league)